Saugeen First Nation is an Ojibway First Nation band located along the Saugeen River and Bruce Peninsula in Ontario, Canada. The band states that their legal name is the "Chippewas of Saugeen". Organized in the mid-1970s, Saugeen First Nation is the primary "political successor apparent" to the Chippewas of Saugeen Ojibway Territory; the other First Nation that is a part of Chippewas of Saugeen Ojibway Territory is Cape Croker. The Ojibway are of the Algonquian languages family. The First Nation consist of four reserves: Chief's Point 28, Saugeen 29, Saugeen Hunting Grounds 60A, and Saugeen and Cape Croker Fishing Islands 1.

The Saugeen First Nation Web site states that "the Ojibway heritage is rich in colour and expression.  This is evident in dance, works of art and the hand made craft creations".

History

Origins
The original historic people of Saugeen are Ojibway. They became known as Chippewa by English-speaking people who could not pronounce the word Ojibway. "Chippewas of Saugeen" is the legal name of the community. Like other Aboriginal people in Canada, in the early 1970s the Chippewas of Saugeen began referring to their community as a "First Nation."

Archaeological evidence proves the modern Bruce Peninsula (or the "Saugeen Peninsula" as it is known by the Ojibway) was home to the Chippewas of Saugeen. From time immemorial, hunting and fishing were plentiful in this area. Archaeologists have found artifacts from the Early Woodland Period (1000 BCE to 1000 CE), and have called this culture the Saugeen complex, in archeological terms. Other than pottery, the projectile points called Saugeen Point are typical characteristics of the Saugeen culture. Winter camps around Owen Sound, Cape Croker and the Collingwood area, as well as summer camps in Walkerton, Wiarton, Goderich, Tobermory and Red Bay were associated with the Saugeen complex and descendant Chippewas of Saugeen Ojibway Territory. Traditional territory also included all of the Saugeen River watershed. Thus, places such as Tobermory, Meaford, Goderich, Cape Croker, Owen Sound, and Orangeville are located in the traditional Saugeen Ojibway Nation Territory. The permanent settlement at the outlet of the Saugeen River, which lent its name to the region and its people, was called Zaageeng, meaning "mouth of river."

The Chippewas of Saugeen Ojibway are a member of the Council of Three Fires of the Ojibway, Odawa, and Pottawatomi nations. The Confederacy came to help in the Battle of Skull Mound and in the Battle of Blue Mountain.

The Wyandotte/Wendat Nation also made the area their home, as did the related Petun or Tobacco people. Both of these were Iroquoian-speaking peoples.

Four of Seven major clans or doodem are found among the Chippewas of Saugeen.

One of the earliest documents recognizing Nation to Nation relations between the Crown and Indigenous peoples in North America, the Royal Proclamation of 1763 stated "Indian land" could only be sold to the Crown. It attempted to reserve areas west of the Allegheny Mountains in the Thirteen Colonies to Native Americans, but the Crown could not control the movement of colonists.

People from many nations moved into Saugeen Ojibway Nation Territory after the disruption of the War of 1812 between the United States and Great Britain. Many came from Ohio and from the State of New York. As a result of the American Indian Removal Policies of the 1830s and the 1833 Treaty of Chicago, a large number of Potawatomi Indians from Michigan and Wisconsin were forced from their homelands, settling at Cape Croker, Saugeen, and many other reserves in Ontario. In 1907, W. M. Wooster was tasked by the United States Congress to locate and record a census of Potawatomi that fled into Canada. Wooster, with the assistance of interpreter Charles Keeshick, recorded 318 Potawatomi living in Cape Croker and 306 Potawatomi living in Saugeen.

Some were on their way to the Manitoulin Island project, the traditional homeland of the Odawa. Some moved from Coldwater on the Narrows. Others came from the Toronto and Niagara regions after newcomers encroached on their territories. Due to these influxes of people from other areas, the history of the Chippewas of Saugeen is often confused with others who settled in Ojibway Territory after the American Revolution. Particularly, the history of those who settled in Cape Croker in 1854 has been confused with the history of the Chippewas of Saugeen.

Tract Agreement

Within 50 years of the Royal Proclamation, European residents of Upper Canada and its partners wanted the surrounding Indian lands, including the Saugeen Ojibway Nation Territory. The army, Indian Affairs and missionaries were aided by some Aboriginal people from other parts of Canada in achieving the “surrender” of the Saugeen territory.

Sir Francis Bond Head, represented the government of Upper Canada, T.G. Anderson signed on behalf of Indian Affairs, J. Stinson signed for Wesley Missions, and F.L. Ingall represented the 15th Regiment of the Army. Three other non-Aboriginal men witnessed the signing. Four “Indian” men, who were not chiefs or head men of Saugeen, signed by their doodem and agreed to: “surrender Sauking Territory” and to “repair to (Manitoulin) Island or to the territory north of Owen Sound.”  They were Mettiewabe, Kaquta Bunevairear, Kowgiswasis, and Mettawansh.

The original people of Saugeen never surrendered or signed away their land or water.

In 1834 some people attempted to surrender Saugeen’s Fishing Islands by leasing them to the Huron Fishing Company. But again they were not the Chippewas of Saugeen; they were Jacob Metigwob, from Manitoulin Island, John Ansance from Christian Island, and the Matweyosh families from the Caldwell Band of the Chippewas of Point Pelee.

Around that time, the provincial government wanted all Anishinaabe people to agree to surrender their traditional territory and move to Manitoulin Island. And, many people from the Coldwater and Point Pelee area sought shelter in Saugeen territory after other events and when other people moved into their homeland.

According to some people, the chief of the Saugeen Ojibway at the time of the Saugeen Tract Agreement was Wahbahdick. Chief Wahbahdick’s name or doodem is not on the Saugeen Tract Agreement.

According to the First Nation stories, the last traditional chief of the Chippewas of Saugeen Ojibway Territory was John Kedugegwan/Kewaquom. A memorial in the cemetery at Chippewa Hill records John Kedugegwan as the last hereditary chief of Saugeen.

Surrenders and new settlements

Peter Jones b. January 1, 1802-d.1856, was a Mississauga from the Credit River. He was also a Methodist missionary. To the Ojibway he became known as Kahkewaquonaby (Sacred Waving Feathers, referring to the feathers taken from the eagle).

The Kewaquom name is from an original family of the Saugeen Territory. It is associated with the sound Thunder Going Home. They are of the Eagle Clan. Peter Jones said, that by "taking this name I was dedicated to the Thunder God." Thunder birds are represented by eagles. Eagle feathers are used in all sacred Ojibwe ceremonies.

Peter Jones was the son of Tuhbenahneequay, the daughter of Head Chief Wahbansay, and a Welsh surveyor, Augustus Jones. His niece Nahnebahwequa, or Catherine, and her husband William Sutton traveled with him to Saugeen Territory and also lived at the Ojibway camp at Owen Sound. They went to England to solicit funds for their missionary work. Catherine Sutton is also reported to have met with Queen Victoria to ask for compensation for her property. Peter Jones married an Englishwoman, Eliza Field, and had five children.

Peter Jones baptized Chief Kegedonce. Kegedonce was the Chief of the Naguhweseebee-Ausable River Band, who occupied territory near Port Franks, now known as the Pinery-Ipperwash area. Kegedonce took the Christian name Peter and became known as Peter Kegedonce Jones. He told Peter Jones he would accept Christianity if Chief Wawanosh from Sarnia did. In the directory of First Nations Individuals in South Western Ontario 1750-1850, by Greg Curnoe, Kegedonce is recorded as telling Rev. Peter Jones that he wanted to settle at Saugeen and accept presents at the mouth of the Red River-Goderich.

Chief Kegedonce Jones was found murdered near Goderich in 1831. His wife and family moved to the Owen Sound village, "to escape Kegedonce's enemies" (Mullin 1997). His son, also named Peter Kegedonce Jones, would later become a chief.

In compliance with their agreement, Indian Affairs built eight houses. Thomas Anderson, Superintendent of Indian Affairs noted on November 6, 1845 that “Four families from outside Saugeen Territory, two Michigan Pottawatomi and two from elsewhere in Canada occupied those houses.”

Chief Wahbudick lived at the Owen Sound village of the Saugeen people when others sought shelter in the territory.

The Imperial Proclamation of 1847 imposes various conditions for surrender of lands and states that no surrender "shall be approved of or acted upon unless resolved on or approved at a meeting of Sachems Chiefs or principal men of the said Ojibway Indians . . .”

On October 13, 1854, the church and the government gathered some men to place their name on their proposed cession and division of more of the Saugeen territory.

From traditional to an elected style of government

He was the son of Nawahjegezhewabe, Chief Joseph Sawyer who was b.1786 in Genesee County, New York. Records in the Canadian Archives note that David Sawyer came to live with some of the people at the Owen Sound village that eventually became known as Nawash. It is recorded that the Nawash, "on March 9, 1855, passed a resolution that David Sawyer replace Kegedonce as their chief and interpreter." David Sawyer attended the mission school taught by Peter Jones' brother Thayendanega or John Jones. David Sawyer signed the treaty of 1854 to surrender most of Saugeen Territory.

Records in Library and Archives Canada state that, "when Sawyer was absent from the Owen Sound area in 1856, the Indian Department" secured the surrender" when, "a few Indians were invited to Toronto to sign a Treaty" where they surrendered the Owen Sound village, "including Sawyer's farm" and Catherine Sutton's new home.

Treaty No. 82 was signed at Toronto, February 9, 1857. It sold “the land upon which we now reside, commonly known as the Nawash or Owen Sound Reserve.”

Treaty No. 93, surrendered the area known as Colpoy’s Bay of Saugeen Territory.

The 1851 census lists John Johnston as American Potawatomi. He signed the treaty of 1854.

In the Directory of First Nations Individuals in South-Western Ontario 1750–1850, Greg Curnoe records James Newash as an Odawa. He is reported to have moved to Saugeen after the War of 1812 and the Battle at Moraviantown in Ohio. It is said that Nawash fought with Tecumseh. He settled with his community on the fighting islands of Detroit River around 1815 and moved to the Miami River in 1819. James Newash also signed the Treaty of 1854 .

Charles Keeshig is recorded as being a highly educated Pottawatomi from the United States who worked as an interpreter in Saugeen Territory. He was the brother-in-law of Peter Jones Kegedonce. That Kegedonce was the son of Kegedonce, Chief of the Ausable River people by Kettle and Stony Point.

The Department of Indian Affairs replaced David Sawyer with Charles Keeshick as agent for the people who became known as the Nawash of Owen Sound. Library and Archives Canada, notes that "during Keeshick's term of office the band ceded to the government in 1854, almost all of the Bruce Peninsula." He signed the Treaty of 1854.

The Treaty of 1854 was one of the biggest land grabs in history. It involved the surrender of 1.5 million acres (6070 km2) of the traditional territory of the Saugeen Ojibway. It is recorded as No.72 : Surrender of the Saugeen Peninsula.

The doodem of Chief Wahbudick appears on that treaty even though Thomas Anderson, as Superintendent of Indian Affairs, had removed him from official office as the Chief of the Saugeen Ojibway.

The time of surrenders and treaties was very difficult for the Saugeen Ojibway. Most could not read or write English, which was the language used to sign and record land surrenders and treaties. It was also the time that people from other places allowed the Department of Indian Affairs into Saugeen Ojibway Territory to set up an elected form of government.

A historical plaque, erected by the Province of Ontario, provides the following summary of developments during that era. (Location: Allenford, picnic area on the south side of Highway 21 just west of Allenford Road.) The plaque reads as follows:

Land ownership issues
In 1994, the Saugeen First Nation and the Chippewas of Nawash Unceded First Nation filed a lawsuit against the Government of Canada; the claims for land, and payment of rent on lands, discussed in early treaties are significant. The suit has yet to be settled. The Official Plan for the Town of Saugeen Shores (2014) includes the following comment about this issue: "The Chippewas of the Saugeen First Nation and the Chippewas of Nawash First Nation have filed a Native Land Claim for the islands in the Saugeen River, the lands that border the north side of the Saugeen River and the shoreline from the mouth of the Saugeen River northerly around the Bruce Peninsula."

Note too that in the areas around Sauble Beach and Southampton, numerous cottages are on land previously owned by a community or the county but now defined as part of the Native lands. Years earlier, the Saugeen First Nation had successfully reclaimed the land that "runs south from the Sauble Beach sign toward Southampton, 18 kilometres away", according to one news report. A lease relationship exists between the Saugeen First Nation and those who had built seasonal homes on the land in the a lakeside area between urban Southampton, Ontario and Sauble Beach. They pay an annual lease fee to the First Nation. The current lease contract between the cottagers and the two Saugeen First Nation Reserves, Saugeen 29 and Chief's Point 28, is in effect until 30 April 2021.

The Saugeen First Nation already owns and controls a large area of the beach (south portion) within the community of Sauble Beach, referred to by the band as Sauble Park or South Sauble Beach Park. In addition to the Sauble Park area, the Saugeen First Nation claims the rights to another stretch of the public beach, approximately 2 km long, west of Lakeshore Boulevard extending to a point between 1st St. South and 6th St. North. The matter has been in litigation since 1990 with the federal government backing the First Nation suit.

Government

Current band council
In the 21st century, the Saugeen First Nations government consists of an elected chief and nine councillors. The current chief is Lester Anoquot. The nine councillors as of September 1, 2020 election are:

 Conrad Ritchie - Head Councillor
 Melissa Snowdon
 Sheena Kewageshig
 Doran Ritchie
 Letitia Thompson
 Vernon Roote
 Lorne Mandawoub
 Mike Henry
 Gayle Mason-Stark

Services provided by federal and provincial agencies
The government of Canada and the province of Ontario provide the funds for Saugeen First Nation, which are administered by different departments such as:
 Education
 Membership
 Finance
 Scroll
 IT Tech
 Housing
 Band Administrator
 Executive Staff
 Chief and Council
 Economic Development
 Lands and Leasing
 G'Shawdagawin Day Care
 Kabaeashawim Women's Shelter – all women welcome, not just First Nation Residents
 Elders' Facility
 Mino Bimaadsawin Health Centre
 Aaron Roote Memorial Youth Centre
 Employment and Training Centre
 Library
 Works Department
 Fisheries Department
 Waterworks
 Water Project Manager

Reserves

The Saugeen First Nation's reserve includes four land reserves and portions of Lake Huron.

Chief's Point 28

The reserve is 5.18 km2 (2.00 sq mi).

Saugeen 29

The reserve's size is 41.43 km2 (16.00 sq mi). As of 2011 the population is 726. It is considered the main reserve of the First Nation.

Saugeen Hunting Grounds 60A

The reserve is 7.28 km2 (2.81 sq mi).

Saugeen and Cape Croker Fishing Islands

The reserve consist of 89 island shared with Saugeen First Nation.
Of these three, the 63.81 km2 (24.64 sq. mi.) Neyaashiinigmiing 27 is considered the main reserve and Saugeen & Cape Croker Fishing Island 1 is shared with Saugeen First Nation.

Water Project

Due to inadequate potable water supply to the First Nation, the Saugeen First Nation received a significant water and sewer improvement assistance of $14 million in the 2006-2007 fiscal year to provide the First Nation with clean treated drinking water. The new system consists of a connection to the town of Saugeen Shores municipal water supply system, construction of a pump house and above-grade reservoir, a water distribution system, back-up electrical generating system, elevated storage reservoir  (water tower), and the decommissioning of six pump houses and associated small-diameter water mains. The drinking water is still treated in Southampton's new Zenon Environmental Water Treatment Plant. The improvement project was completed in July 2008.

Sports
 Saugeen Blues - Slo-Pitch Team
 Saugeen Thunderbirds - Fastball team
 Saugeen Rez Men - Fastball Team
 Saugeen Red Men - Minor League Baseball teams name
 Saugeen Little Native Hockey Tournament Teams (Team Names Change every year)
 Annual Baseball Tournament First week in July
 Annual Road Hockey Tournament
 Annual Horseshoe Tournament

Businesses

Native owned/operated
 Slabtown Cannabis Dispensary on Highway 21
 Saugeen Gas Bar on Cameron Drive and French Bay Road
 Little Barn Craft Shop on French Bay Road
 Standing Arrows Smoke shop on French Bay and Highway 21
 Lone Wolf 24-hour Coffee and Cigarettes & Fireworks
 Hungry Wolf Chip Stand - Native and Canadian cuisine
 Slabtown Tobacco Shop on Highway 21
 Stoner Station on Highway 21
 Original Green Dispensary on Highway 21
 Warrior Healing on South Sauble Beach
 Kim's Discount Smokes on the Sauble Beach Highway
 RPM Motopark on Kewaydin and Scotch Settlement
 Tuggies Cigarettes on Highway 21
 Wesley's No Tax Smokes on Highway 21
 Native Crafts and Baskets on Highway 21
 No Name Cigarettes and Fireworks & Snacks
 Fries & More on French Bay Road
 Fry Stand on South Sauble Beach
 Paul Kings Contracting
 Bear Foot Park (Luxury Trailer Rentals on the lakeshore)

Non-native owned/operated

Gift Bowl in South Sauble Beach across from North Sauble Beach

Arts and entertainment

Arts
There are many artisans in Saugeen First Nation who create many different kinds of handicraft and paintings. The most noted artists of the nation is Robert Henry Jr, who recently returned to the community and Kelly Roote, who lives in Australia but operates internationally.

Entertainment
The Recreation Centre on the Saugeen First Nation is host to activities such as Darts for meat, Karate, Fitness gym, Bingo every Monday, Ball Hockey, Volleyball, Badminton, Basketball, and dodgeball; the Recreation Centre also provides other activities for young children and teenagers.

One such program is S.Y.C.O.P.S in which group members go on trips such as whitewater rafting, and is often run in conjunction with the Toronto Police Department, Anishinabek Police and the Saugeen Recreation Center.

 Saugeen Wesley United Church - Amphitheatre provides visitors from all around the world with memorial rock gardens over looking the Saugeen River, several nature trails go to the river, also a view of the "FRIENDSHIP" sign on the river flats can be read from space. Funding for gardens provided by donations and Saugeen First Nation.
 Saugeen First Nation has an annual fireworks display on the Sunday of the May 24 weekend (weather permitting). (At the Amphitheatre free admission, donations appreciated)
 Saugeen First Nation also host their Annual Pow-wow every year at the James Mason Memorial Centre located on French bay road near hwy 21.

Cultural attractions

Pow wow
The Saugeen First Nation has a competition Pow-wow on the second weekend of August showcasing Native Dance, Handicraft, and Contemporary Native music. It is open to all spectators for a small admission. Dancers and singers compete for money.  The pow-wow grounds are located at the James Mason Cultural Centre on French Bay Road.

Notable members
Gerry Barrett (Stand-up comedian)
Mark Kahgee (Tattooist)
Duke Redbird (Television reporter, Poet, Native-craft store owner in Toronto)
Robert Henry Jr. (Native painter)
Vernon Roote (Former Chief of Saugeen and Grand Council Chief of the Anishinabek Nation)
Kelly Roote, (artist, now living in Australia)
Nicole Pealow (Lacrosse player, York University)
John Henry Yahba (First World War recipient of the Distinguished Conduct Medal)

Religion
The Saugeen First Nation is home to many denominations of Christianity, such as the Wesley United Church (United), Saugeen Full Gospel Church (Pentecostal), Baptist Church, Roman Catholic, The Church of Jesus Christ of Latter-day Saints, and a small multi-denominational Church on French Bay Road.

Many residents are going back to the traditional ways or co-practising Midewin and Christian religions.

Contemporary issues
 Like Chief Wahbudick, many people of Saugeen still do not believe in surrendering their rights or the birthrights of their children.
 The original people of Saugeen still defend their territory.
 It is also important to remember where Kegedonce was found as Dudley George and other warriors defended traditional burial grounds by Ipperwash-Ausable River.
 The Duluth Declaration of 1995 affirm Saugeen First Nation's jurisdiction over the waters around the Saugeen/Bruce Peninsula. Though a 1993 Canadian Federal Court decision declaring that the Ojibways' right to fish commercially takes precedence over any other activity, the Ontario Ministry of Natural Resources have attempted to impose an Aboriginal Communal Fishing Licence on the Saugeen First Nation, a direct assault on Tribal Sovereignty, which the Saugeen First Nation have never abrogated authority or relinquished it to any other entity.
 Since 1830 the people were influenced and their lives affected by newcomers to the Saugeen Territory. These influences include:
 Two-thirds of the current population of the Saugeen First Nation are not members of Saugeen. Many non-Native and Native people from other bands spouses of Saugeen-member enjoy housing through low interest loans, if the Band Member and Non Band Member divorce then the Band member will retain all property rights as Non band members cannot own property on reserve although they may lease the land. Leasing of land is usually only done on South Sauble Beach for cottages.
 Racial and Cultural make-up of the Saugeen population now consists of Black/Ojibway, Chinese/Ojibway, Scottish/Ojibway, Ukrainian/Ojibway, Jewish/Ojibway, Ojibway/Odawa, Ojibway/Oneida, Ojibway/French and Ojibway/Pottawatomi, to name only a few.

Media

The Saugeen News, published by the band council, is a monthly newsletter sent out to all band members containing band member birthdays, events at the beach and information from community organizations such as the local Recreation Centre and the Mino Bimaadsawin Health Centre.

Saugeen First Nation has no commercial media of its own, although radio and television stations from Owen Sound, Wingham, Port Elgin and Kincardine can be heard in the area.

In print, the daily Owen Sound Sun Times and the weekly Shoreline Beacon from Port Elgin also serve the community.

Distant television signals from Michigan (particularly Detroit, Saginaw, Flint and Sault Ste. Marie) can sometimes also be received in the area.

See also
 Aboriginal peoples in Canada
 Donaldson site
 Ojibwa

References

 Ojibway of Southern Ontario by Peter Schmalz, 1991, University of Toronto Press
 Disunity and Dispossession: Nawash Ojibwa and Pottawatomi in the Saugeen Territory, 1836-1865 by Stephanie McMullen, 1997, University of Calgary Masters Thesis
 Deeds/Nations: Directory of First Nations Individuals in South-Western Ontario 1750-1850 by Greg Curnoe, http://www.adamsheritage.com/deedsnations/default.htm www.adamsheritage.com/deedsnations/default.htm
 Dictionary of Canadian Biographies. Donald B. Smith. 2000. University of Toronto/Universite Laval
 Sacred feathers: the Reverend Peter Jones (Kahkewaquonaby) & the Mississauga Indians by Donald B. Smith., 1987, University of Toronto Press
 Pre-History of Southern Ontario by Nicholas Adams, 1995, http://www.adamsheritage.com/pre/e-mwood.htm
 Ontario Prehistory Archaeological Survey of Canada Woodland Period 1000 B.C. ~ A.D. 1000 by Canadian Museum of Civilization, http://www.civilization.ca/cmc/archeo/oracles/ontario/10.htm
 Saugeen Points by London Chapter Ontario Archaeological Society, http://www.ssc.uwo.ca/assoc/oas/points/saugeen.html
 Indian Treaties and Surrenders. Volume 1: Treaties 1-138. Reprinted Saskatoon: Fifth House.1992

External links
The Saugeen First Nation
Saugeen Economic Development
Saugeen Lands Management
Ontario Archaeology Society The Archaeology of Ontario - Middle Woodland Period
Archaeological Survey of Canada: Ontario Prehistory
Peace Brigade International article
Duluth Declaration

 
First Nations governments in Ontario
Communities in Bruce County
First Nations history in Ontario